Bontnewydd (Welsh, meaning 'New Bridge' in English) is a small village and community  with a population of 1,162 located on the A487 road  south of Caernarfon in Gwynedd, Wales, close to the river Gwyrfai,  from its outflow into Foryd Bay.

It is served by Bontnewydd railway station, an unstaffed halt on the Welsh Highland Railway. The village has one small supermarket, an outdoor attraction called Gypsy Wood Park, a pub called The Newborough Arms and one school.
Bontnewydd was known as Bodallog prior to the new bridge being built.

According to the 2011 Census, Bontnewydd is the community with the 3rd highest percentage of Welsh speakers in Wales. 82.6% of residents aged three and over reported being able to speak Welsh in the 2011 Census, as compared to 84.8% reporting being able to do so in the 2001 Census.

Since 1995 Bontnewydd has also formed an electoral ward, represented by a county councillor on Gwynedd Council.

The community includes Llanfaglan.

References

External links

walesindex.co.uk
www.geograph.co.uk : photos of Bontnewydd and surrounding area
School website

 Bontnewydd
Gwynedd electoral wards